The 27th Legislative Assembly of Saskatchewan was elected in the 2011 Saskatchewan election, and was sworn in on November 30, 2011. It sat until November 26, 2015. It was controlled by the Saskatchewan Party under Premier Brad Wall.

Members

Standings changes since the 27th general election

References

Notes

Sources
 

Terms of the Saskatchewan Legislature